Phoberus caffer is a species of hide beetle in the subfamily Troginae.

References

caffer
Beetles described in 1872